Granville Fjord is a fjord in Avannaata municipality, Northwest Greenland.

Geography
Granville Fjord is located in Steensby Land, in the stretch of coast between Cape York and Cape Alexander. It is located west of the Wolstenholme Fjord,  close to the Moriusaq Inuit settlement.

The fjord's mouth is located NW of Saunders Island, to the WNW of the Wolstenholme Fjord, between the points of Manussaq and Uvdlisautinguag. Cape Peary is the headland on the eastern side of the mouth. The Berlingske Glacier has its terminus at the head of the fjord.

Three Sister Bees are a group of small and flat islands that lie at the mouth of the fjord.

See also
List of fjords of Greenland

References

External links
Retreating glacier in Granville Fjord, bergy bits float in a pool at its foot. North West Greenland.

Fjords of Greenland